Richard Newton Rosecrance (born 1930) is an American political scientist. His research and teaching is focused on international relations, in particular the link between economics and international relations. His research and writing has also touched upon the study of history. Rosecrance is considered an adherent of liberal international relations theory.

Education
Rosecrance received his BA from UCLA, his MA from Swarthmore College, and his PhD under William Yandell Elliott from Harvard University.

Career 
During the 1960s, Rosecrance taught at the University of California, Los Angeles.  He was Director of what later became known as the Burkle Center for International Relations at UCLA. During the 1970s, Rosecrance was on the faculty of Cornell University, where he was the Walter S. Carpenter Jr. Professor of International and Comparative Politics.

He served on the Policy Planning Council of the U.S. Department of State and has received Guggenheim, Fulbright, Rockefeller, Ford, and many other fellowships. Rosecrance has held visiting positions at the International Institute for Strategic Studies, King's College London, the London School of Economics, the European University Institute (Florence), and the Australian National University.

Rosecrance currently is Adjunct Professor in Public Policy at the John F. Kennedy School of Government at Harvard University. In addition he is Research Professor of Political Science at the University of California and Senior Fellow in the Belfer Center for Science and International Affairs at the John F. Kennedy School of Government.

Publications

Rosecrance has written widely on international topics including:
Australian diplomacy and Japan, 1945-1951  (1962)
Action and Reaction in World Politics (1963)
The dispersion of nuclear weapons : strategy and politics (1964)
 Defense of the Realm: British Strategy in the Nuclear Epoch (1968)
 International Relations: Peace or War? (1973)
 The Rise of the Trading State (1986)
 The Rise of the Virtual State (1999, translated into Chinese, Japanese, Arabic, and German)
 America's Economic Resurgence (1990)
 The Costs of Conflict (1999, coeditor)
 The Domestic Bases of Grand Strategy (1993)
 The New Great Power Coalition (2001, editor)
 No More States? (2006, editor).
 The Resurgence of the West: How a Transatlantic Union Can Prevent War and Restore the United States and Europe (2013)
 Mergers and International Politics (in progress?)
 The Next Great War? The Roots of World War I and the Risk of U.S.-China Conflict (2014, co-editor)
 International Politics: How History Modifies Theory (2018, co-editor).

See also
International relations theory

References

Richard Rosecrance's bio at Harvard Kennedy School's Belfer Center

1930 births
Living people
Harvard Kennedy School faculty
Cornell University faculty
American political scientists
International relations scholars
Harvard University alumni
University of California, Los Angeles alumni
Swarthmore College alumni